Giovanni Domenico Paladini (Lucca, 1721 - Lucca, 1772) was an Italian painter.

Biography
He trained under Giovanni Domenico Lombardi. He painted figures, animals, and still-life. He was also an actor in comedies.

References

1721 births
1772 deaths
18th-century Italian painters
Italian male painters
Painters from Lucca
18th-century Italian male artists